Adriano R. Papa, Jr. (July 14, 1945 – October 27, 2005), better known as Jun Papa, was a Filipino basketball player. Papa was born in Manila, Philippines. He played for the NU Bulldogs in the University Athletic Association of the Philippines, Ysmael Steel Admirals and the Crispa-Floro Redmanizers in the Manila Industrial and Commercial Athletic Association. Papa also appeared at the Olympic Games as a member of the country's national basketball team.

In 1975, Papa joined the Mariwasa franchise in the PBA where he took the franchise to a finals appearance, losing to Crispa 3-1 during the 1977 All-Filipino Conference best-of-five championship series. Though on the losing side, he was included in that season's Mythical Five. In the six PBA seasons that he played (1975–80), he posted 17.5 ppg scoring average in his career.

References

External links
 

1945 births
2005 deaths
Olympic basketball players of the Philippines
Basketball players at the 1968 Summer Olympics
Basketball players at the 1972 Summer Olympics
Basketball players at the 1966 Asian Games
Basketball players at the 1970 Asian Games
Basketball players from Manila
NU Bulldogs basketball players
Philippines men's national basketball team players
Filipino men's basketball players
Crispa Redmanizers players
Great Taste Coffee Makers players
Asian Games competitors for the Philippines